Jim Healy may refer to:
Jim Healy (trade unionist) (1898–1961), Australian trade union leader
Jim Healy (sports commentator) (1923–1994), sports commentator from Los Angeles, California
Jim Healy (Gaelic footballer) (born 1952), Irish Gaelic footballer

See also
James Healy (disambiguation)